The Cole-Davidson equation is a model used to describe dielectric relaxation in glass-forming liquids. The equation for the complex permittivity is

The exponent  represents the exponent of the decay of the high frequency wing of the imaginary part, .

The Cole–Davidson equation is a generalization of the Debye relaxation keeping the initial increase of the low frequency wing of the imaginary part, . Because this is also a characteristic feature of the Fourier transform of the stretched exponential function it has been considered as an approximation of the latter, although nowadays an approximation by the Havriliak-Negami function or exact numerical calculation may be preferred.

The real and imaginary parts are

and

References

Equations
Glass
Liquids
Electric and magnetic fields in matter